Keskilaakso is a newspaper published typically Tuesdays and Thursdays in Kouvola, Finland.

History
Keskilaakso was established in 1931 under the name Kymen Keskilaakso. First publishing in November 1931, at that time, the editor-in-chief was F. A. Havola. In 1975 the name became Anjalankosken Sanomat and in 2007 the newspaper was renamed to Keskilaakso.

References

External links
Keskilaakso

1931 establishments in Finland
Finnish-language newspapers
Weekly newspapers published in Finland
Publications established in 1931
Kouvola